Euarestella is a genus of tephritid  or fruit flies in the family Tephritidae.

Species
Euarestella abyssinica Hering, 1937
Euarestella iphionae (Efflatoun, 1924)
Euarestella korneyevi Merz, 2011
Euarestella kugleri Freidberg, 1974
Euarestella megacephala (Loew, 1846)
Euarestella nigra Merz, 2008
Euarestella pninae Freidberg, 1981

References

Tephritinae
Tephritidae genera
Diptera of Africa
Diptera of Asia
Diptera of Europe